Arene bitleri is a species of sea snail, a marine gastropod mollusk in the family Areneidae.

Description

The shell can grow to be 3 mm to 5 mm in length.

Distribution
Arene bitleri can be found from Panama to the Netherlands Antilles.

References

External links
 To Biodiversity Heritage Library (1 publication)
 To Encyclopedia of Life
 To World Register of Marine Species

Areneidae
Gastropods described in 1958